Rosa Venerini (9 February 1656 – 7 May 1728) was a pioneer in the education of women and girls in 17th-century Italy and the foundress of the Religious Teachers Venerini, a Roman Catholic religious institute of women, often simply called the Venerini Sisters. She was canonized by Pope Benedict XVI on 15 October 2006.

Early life
Venerini was born in 1656 in Viterbo, Italy, then a part of the Papal States. Her father, Goffredo, originally from Castelleone di Suasa, Ancona, after having completed his medical studies at Rome, moved to Viterbo where he practiced at the major hospital of the city. He became noted for his work. From his marriage to Marzia Zampichetti, of an ancient family of the city, four children were born: Domenico, Maria Maddalena, Rosa and Orazio.

According to her first biographer, Girolamo Andreucci, Venerini made a vow to consecrate her life to God at the age of seven. At age twenty, though, Rosa had questions about her own future and chose to accept an offer of marriage; her fiancé, however, died shortly after this.

In the autumn of that year, on the advice of her father, Venerini entered the Dominican Monastery of St. Catherine, where her aunt was a member of the monastery. She remained in the monastery for only a few months, however, because the sudden death of her father forced her to return to care for her mother.  Her brother, Domenico, then died at 27. A few months later, worn out by grief, her mother also died. In the meantime, Rose's sister Maria Maddalena married. There remained at home only Orazio and Rosa, by now 24 years old. Rosa began to gather girls and women of the area in her own home to recite the rosary.

After Venerini's first contacts with the Dominican friars at the Sanctuary of Our Lady of the Oak Tree, near Viterbo, she chose to follow the spirituality of Ignatius of Loyola under the direction of the Jesuits, especially Ignatius Martinelli, who became her spiritual director. Under his guidance, she saw the need to dedicate herself to the instruction and Christian formation of young

On 30 August 1685, with the approval of the Bishop of Viterbo, Cardinal Giulio Cesare Sacchetti, and the collaboration of two friends, Gerolama Coluzzelli and Porzia Bacci, Rosa left her father's home to begin her first school. The first objective of this foundress was to give poor girls a complete Christian formation and to prepare them for life in society. Without great pretense, Rose opened the first public school for girls in Italy.

Expansion 
The initial stages were not easy. The three teachers had to face the resistance of clergy who considered the teaching of the catechism as their private office. But the harshest suspicion came from conformists who were scandalized by the boldness of this woman of the upper middle class of Viterbo, who had taken to heart the education of ignorant girls. With her characteristic strength, Rosa continued on the path that she had undertaken. The same pastors recognized the moral improvement that the work of education generated among the girls and their mothers.

The validity of this initiative was acknowledged and its fame went beyond the confines of the diocese. Cardinal Marcantonio Barbarigo, Bishop of Montefiascone, had the insight to understand the Viterbo project and he invited Venerini to come to his diocese to give advice on the administration of schools in the diocese and to help train teachers. From 1692 to 1694, she opened ten schools in Montefiascone and the villages surrounding Lake Bolsena. The cardinal provided the material means and Rosa made the families aware of the value of education for their daughters, trained the teachers, and organized the schools.

When she had to return to Viterbo to attend to her first school, Venerini entrusted the Montefiascone schools and the teachers to the direction of a young woman, Lucia Filippini, in whom she had seen particular gifts of mind, heart and spirit and whom the cardinal had entrusted with the leadership of the project in his diocese. Filippini organized the teachers of that diocese as a separate religious congregation known as the Religious Teachers Filippini.

After the openings in Viterbo and Montefiascone, other schools were started throughout the region of Lazio. Venerini was invited to Rome in 1706 to establish a school, but the attempt was a failure, which caused her to wait six long years before regaining the trust of the authorities. On 8 December 1713, with the help of Abbot Degli Atti, a friend of the Venerini family, Rosa was able to open a school in the center of Rome, at the foot of the Campidoglio.

On 24 October 1716 the Sisters received a visit by Pope Clement XI, accompanied by eight cardinals, who wanted to observe the lessons. At the end of the morning he addressed these words to Rose: “Signora Rosa, you are doing that which we cannot do. We thank you very much, because with these schools you will sanctify Rome ”.

From that moment on, governors and cardinals asked for schools for their areas. The duties of the foundress became intense, consisting of travels and hard work, interwoven with joys and sacrifices for the formation of new communities. Wherever a new school sprang up, in a short time a moral improvement could be noted in the youth.

Death and legacy
Rose Venerini died at the community at the Basilica of San Marco in Rome on the evening of 7 May 1728. By then, she had opened more than 40 schools. Her remains were entombed in the nearby Jesuit Church of the Gesù, so loved by her. In 1952, on the occasion of her beatification, they were transferred to the chapel of the General Motherhouse in Rome.

The Sisters went to the United States in 1909, primarily to help the Italian immigrants to that country, establishing the first day care centers in many cities of the Northeastern United States. They served in Switzerland from 1971 to 1985 and the congregation has since extended its apostolic activity to other lands: India, Brazil, Cameroon, Romania, Albania, Chile, Venezuela and Nigeria.

Venerini was canonized by Pope Benedict XVI on 15 October 2006. Her feast day is 7 May.

See also
 Saint Rose Venerini, patron saint archive

References

External links

1656 births
1728 deaths
People from Viterbo
Italian educators
18th-century Italian Roman Catholic religious sisters and nuns
Founders of Catholic religious communities
Beatifications by Pope Pius XII
Christian female saints of the Early Modern era
Canonizations by Pope Benedict XVI
18th-century Christian saints
Italian Roman Catholic saints
17th-century Italian Roman Catholic religious sisters and nuns